Pedro Carneiro may refer to:
Pedro Carneiro (musician) (born 1975), Portuguese musician
Pedro Carneiro (footballer) (born 1997), Portuguese footballer who played as a midfielder